Ranjith is an Indian actor who appears in Tamil and Malayalam language films.

Acting career

After completing a course in acting, Ranjith made his acting debut in 1993 with  Pon Vilangu, directed by K. S. Rajkumar, was produced by R. K. Selvamani and he acted alongside Rahman, Sivaranjani and Ramya Krishnan. The critic K. Vijayan of New Straits Times praised Ranjith's acting citing that "Ranjith, despite his big build, impresses in his debut performance." The next year, he acted the lead role in the rural drama Sindhu Nathi Poo.

In 1996, he appeared in Minor Mappillai as the second lead and in Avathara Purushan. In 1997, he appeared in a guest appearance in Cheran's Bharathi Kannamma which was a critical and commercial success. In the start of 1998, Ranjith played as an antagonist in Maru Malarchi opposite Mammooty, the film was released to critical acclaim and he won the Tamil Nadu State Film Award for Best Villain for his role. Subsequently, he was flooded with offers. In the mid of 1998, he acted in the blockbuster Natpukkaga and played the villain role in Dharma. In the end of 1998, he acted in supporting role in Desiya Geetham and Pudhumai Pithan while he played one of the leads in the low-budget film Cheran Chozhan Pandian. From 1999 to 2001, he had predominantly appeared in supporting and villain roles except in Nesam Pudhusu (1999) and Kann Thirandhu Paaramma (2000) where he played the lead role.

In 2003, Ranjith directed, produced and played the title role in Bheeshmar (2003). The film became a flop in the box office. Following the failure of the film, Ranjith was not able to produce his next own film because of the lack of fund. Ranjith then ventured to do a couple of character roles in Malayalam films.

In 2005, he acted in the political satire film Padhavi Paduthum Paadu and the long delayed film Aadhikkam.

Political career

Ranjith was a member and spokesperson of the All India Anna Dravida Munnetra Kazhagam for many years. After the death of AIADMK supremo Jayalalithaa in December 2016, Ranjith started to support O. Panneerselvam's faction of AIADMK. In July 2018, Ranjith left the AIADMK and joined the Pattali Makkal Katchi as the new deputy leader of the party. On 26 February 2019, Ranjith, the vice president of PMK, quit the party citing that he could not digest S. Ramadoss and Anbumani Ramadoss' change of stance in supporting the AIADMK in the 2019 Indian general election. The next day, Ranjith met Amma Makkal Munnetra Kazhagam's generel secretary T. T. V. Dhinakaran and joined the party officially.

Filmography

TV Series

Voice Artist
 Manoj Bharathiraja - Kadal Pookal (2001)

References

Male actors in Tamil cinema
Indian male film actors
Tamil Nadu State Film Awards winners
Tamil actors
1971 births
Living people
Amma Makkal Munnetra Kazhagam politicians
Pattali Makkal Katchi politicians
All India Anna Dravida Munnetra Kazhagam politicians